Mahir Mahir oğlu Emreli (previously Mahir Anar oğlu Mədətov, born on 1 July 1997) is an Azerbaijani footballer who plays as a striker for Konyaspor and the Azerbaijan national team. Besides Konyaspor, he has played for Baku, Qarabağ, Legia Warsaw and Dinamo Zagreb.

Club career
Emreli made his professional debut in the Azerbaijan Premier League for FC Baku on 27 September 2014 in a game against Araz-Naxçıvan.

Qarabağ
On 16 July 2015, Emreli signed a three-year contract with Qarabağ FK.

On 23 August 2015, Mahir made his debut and scored his first goal for Qarabağ in a 2–0 away victory against Shuvalan.

Emreli made his European debut in 2016 against Luxembourgish F91 Dudelange in the second qualification round of the UEFA Champions League which ended 2–0 for Qarabağ.

On 15 September 2016, Emreli made his debut for UEFA Europa League group stage game against FC Slovan Liberec.

He scored his first European goal in a 1–0 home victory against Danish Copenhagen in the play-off round of the 2017-18 UEFA Champions League.

Emreli made his debut for UEFA Champions League group stage game against Chelsea in Stamford Bridge on 12 September 2017. Mahir made five appearances in the UEFA Champions League group stage.

On 18 August 2020, Emreli, scoring against FK Sileks at the first qualifying round of the UEFA Champions League, celebrated his goal with a salute to the Azerbaijani soldiers serving in the frontline during the border clashes with Armenia.

Legia Warsaw
On 8 June 2021, Legia Warsaw announced the signing of Emreli on a contract until 30 June 2024.

On 17 June 2021, Emreli made his debut and scored his first goal for Legia Warsaw in friendly a 5–0 victory against SK Bischofshofen. Mahir scored his first officials goals for Legia in a UEFA Champions League first qualifying round match against Norwegian champions Bodø/Glimt on 7 July 2021.

On 26 August 2021, during play-off match of the 2021–22 UEFA Europa League against Slavia Prague, following an unsuccessful 0–1 first half, Emreli scored two goals and secured qualification of Legia Warszawa to the group stage of the tournament. He set a unique record by scoring in all the tournaments he participated in.

In December 2021, Mahir Emreli was one of the victims of an attack by hooligans on a bus returning after the Ekstraklasa match against Wisła Płock. After this incident, Emreli decided not to play for Legia. On 2 February 2022, he terminated the contract by mutual agreement.

Dinamo Zagreb
Hours after leaving Legia, Emreli was announced as the new player of Dinamo Zagreb in the Croatian First Football League. Legia owed Dinamo one million euros because they bought Lirim Kastrati from them in September 2021 for 1.2 million euros, but by December 2021 Dinamo had received only 200,000 euros. Dinamo decided to drop Legia's debt on the condition that Emreli would leave Legia for free and sign for Dinamo.

On 24 August 2022, Emreli played in the play-off match against FK Bodø/Glimt with Dinamo Zagreb winning 4–1 and ensuring a place in the 2022–23 UEFA Champions League group stage.

Loan to Konyaspor
On 14 February 2023, Emreli was loaned to Süper Lig club Konyaspor until the end of the 2022–23 season with an option of a permanent transfer at the end of the season.

International career

Youth
Azerbaijan won the Islamic Solidarity Games. He was selected by Yashar Vahabzade for his Islamic Solidarity Games U-23 squad, appearing in five games and scoring two goal in the final to help defeat Oman.

Senior
Emreli made his Azerbaijan debut on 9 March 2017 against Qatar in friendly match.

He scored his first goal for Azerbaijan on 29 May 2018, in a friendly match against Kyrgyzstan.

Sponsorship
In 2018, Emreli signed a sponsorship deal with American sportswear and equipment supplier, Nike.

Personal life
In May 2019, Mahir changed his surname from Mədətov to Emreli, taking maternal family name due to his disproval at his father's new marriage.

Career statistics

Club

International

Scores and results list Azerbaijan's goal tally first.

Honours
Qarabağ
 Azerbaijan Premier League: 2015–16, 2016–17, 2017–18, 2018–19, 2019–20
 Azerbaijan Cup: 2015–16, 2016–17

Dinamo Zagreb
 Croatian First Football League: 2021–22

Azerbaijan U23
 Islamic Solidarity Games: 2017

Individual
 Azerbaijan Premier League Top scorer: 2018–19, 2019–20

References

External links
 
 Emreli profile on official club website
 

1997 births
Living people
Association football forwards
Azerbaijani footballers
Azerbaijan international footballers
Azerbaijan under-21 international footballers
Azerbaijan youth international footballers
FC Baku players
Qarabağ FK players
Legia Warsaw players
GNK Dinamo Zagreb players
Konyaspor footballers
Azerbaijan Premier League players
Ekstraklasa players
Croatian Football League players
Süper Lig players
Expatriate footballers in Poland
Expatriate footballers in Croatia
Expatriate footballers in Turkey
Azerbaijani expatriate sportspeople in Poland
Azerbaijani expatriate sportspeople in Turkey
Sportspeople from Tver